Montezuma's Daughter, first published in 1892, is a novel by the Victorian adventure writer H. Rider Haggard. Narrated in the first person by Thomas Wingfield, an Englishman whose adventures include having his mother murdered by his Spanish cousin Juan de Garcia, a brush with the Spanish Inquisition, shipwreck, and slavery. Eventually, Thomas unwillingly joins a Spanish expedition to New Spain, and the novel tells a fictionalized story of the first interactions between the natives and European explorers. This includes a number of misunderstandings, prejudice on the part of the Spaniards, and ultimately open war.

During the course of the story, Thomas meets and marries Otomie,the daughter of the native king from whom the novel takes its title, and settles into life in Mexico. The war destroys his native family, and after his nemesis, Otomie, and his five children perish that Wingfield returns to England and weds Lily Bozard, the English betrothed of his youth.

While Haggard was in Mexico in 1891, doing research for the book, he received news that his only son had died, which dealt him a lasting blow and badly affected his health. Haggard later wrote that Montezuma's Daughter was the last of his best work "for the rest was repetition so far as fiction was concerned". Like many Victorian adventure novels, this one sometimes treats the natives as naïve and barbaric, but this is a flaw Haggard explicitly points out in his main character.

Reception

Gary Westfahl described Montezuma's Daughter and Cleopatra as "atmospheric historical romances".

References
Notes

Bibliography

External links

 
Images and bibliographic information for various editions of Montezuma's Daughter at SouthAfricaBooks.com

1893 British novels
British adventure novels
Aztecs in fiction
English adventure novels
Mesoamerica in fiction
Novels by H. Rider Haggard
Novels set in Tudor England
Victorian novels
Novels set in the 15th century
Novels set during the Conquest of the Americas
Novels set in Mexico